Riders of the Purple Sage is a 1982 American silent Western film directed by Frank Lloyd and starring William Farnum, Mary Mersch, and William Scott. The film is about a former Texas Ranger who goes after a group of Mormons who have abducted his married sister. This Frank Lloyd silent film was the first of five film adaptations of the novel.

Plot
Former Texas Ranger Lassiter (William Farnum) leaves Texas and travels to Arizona sage country pursuing a group of Mormons who abducted his married sister. He arrives at the Withersteen ranch near the Utah border, where his sister was last seen. He meets the Withersteens and their beautiful daughter, Jane (Mary Mersch). Lassiter rescues her rider, Venters (William Scott), from torture at the hands of a villain named Tull (Murdock MacQuarrie). Soon, Lassiter falls in love with Jane, but when she learns about his mission, she is reluctant to help him, fearing more violence will come to the region. Her feelings for him change, however, when she sees the hardened gunfighter befriend her ward, a young orphan girl named Fay Larkin (Nancy Caswell).

While Venters is out searching for the rustlers who have been raiding the Withersteens' ranch and stealing their cattle, he wounds and captures the rustlers' masked leader, who turns out to be a beautiful young woman (Katherine Adams). Rather than turning her over to the law, Venters brings her to a secluded valley, where the two fall in love.

Meanwhile, Lassiter learns that his sister is dead, and that the man who abducted her, Dyer (Marc Robbins), is also responsible for much of the trouble faced by Jane and her family. Lassiter tracks the villain and raids a Mormon meeting, killing Dyer. The angry Mormons then pursue Lassiter, Jane, and Fay to the secluded valley where they meet Venters and the repentant cattle thief, whom Lassiter recognizes as his dead sister's daughter, Millie. Venters and the girl escape the Mormons, but Lassiter, in rolling a huge boulder down on his pursuers, blocks the only exit to the valley, trapping himself, Jane, and Fay inside the valley forever.

Cast
 William Farnum as Lassiter
 Mary Mersch as Jane
 William Scott as Venters
 Marc Robbins as Dyer
 Murdock MacQuarrie as Tull
 Kathryn Adams as Masked Rider / Millie
 Nancy Caswell as Fay Larkin
 J. Holmes as Jerry Carol
 Buck Jones as Bit part (uncredited)
 Jack Nelson as Bit part (uncredited)

Production
Riders of the Purple Sage features uncredited bit parts by future silent film stars Buck Jones and Jack Nelson.

Reception
Riders of the Purple Sage received mixed reviews upon its theatrical release in 1918. The reviewer for Motion Picture News wrote:

The reviewer for Variety called the film a "not-too-absorbing adaptation of the novel", noting that the film "does not rise above the level of the average Western photoplay of this type and there is no special distinction in direction or photography."

In her review for Allmovie, Janiss Garza wrote that despite the "rousing climax", the film was "not one of the better adaptations of the Zane Grey novel."

Like many American films of the time, Riders of the Purple Sage was subject to restrictions and cuts by city and state film censorship boards. For example, the Chicago Board of Censors required a cut, in Reel 3, of the man falling after Lassiter shoots, Reel 6, the intertitle "He made me — I can't tell you — I can't —", the shooting of Oldring, and, Reel 7, last shooting scene in which a Mormon is killed.

Reissues
The film was reissued on April 3, 1921.

See also
 Riders of the Purple Sage
 1937 Fox vault fire

References

External links

 
 
 
 Riders of the Purple Sage at silentera.com

1918 films
1918 Western (genre) films
Films based on works by Zane Grey
Fox Film films
Films based on American novels
Films directed by Frank Lloyd
Films set in Arizona
American black-and-white films
Silent American Western (genre) films
1910s American films
1910s English-language films